Aidan Ross (born 25 October 1995) is an Australia-born New Zealand rugby union player who plays Prop for the  in the Super Rugby competition and for the All Blacks internationally.

Biography 
Ross debuted for the Bay of Plenty in 2015 and was also a member of the New Zealand Under-20 squad who won the Under-20 Championship in Italy.

In 2017, He was called into the Chiefs squad as an injury cover and made his debut against the Western Force on 22 April. He captained the Bay of Plenty when they won the 2019 Mitre 10 Cup Championship final.

In 2021, Ross was called into the All Blacks squad as an injury cover for Karl Tu'inukuafe ahead of the second test against Fiji but did not get to play. He made his international debut for New Zealand against Ireland on 9 July 2022 at Dunedin.

References

External links 

 Chiefs Profile

 

New Zealand rugby union players
1995 births
Living people
Rugby union props
Bay of Plenty rugby union players
Chiefs (rugby union) players
Rugby union players from Sydney
New Zealand international rugby union players